The following is a list of Major League Baseball players, retired or active. As of the end of the 2011 season, there have been 320 players with a last name that begins with O who have been on a major league roster at some point.

O

References

External links 
Last Names starting with O – Baseball-Reference.com

 O